What Every Woman Wants is a 1919 American drama film directed by Jesse D. Hampton and starring Grace Darmond, Wilfred Lucas, Forrest Stanley, and Claire Du Brey. Based on a screenplay by William Parker, the film was released by the Robertson-Cole Pictures Corporation.

Plot
As described in a film magazine, Gloria Graham (Darmond), a young woman employed at an office for a small salary, believes that the capacity of a business woman for success depends upon dressing well. After she goes into debt, she is about to be rescued by marriage to the man she loves, Philip Belden (Stanley), but World War I breaks out and he enlists. She then falls for a snare set by her employer Horace Lennon (Lucas), who sends her to a clothing shop with a card allowing her to buy what she wants and to charge it to his account. After news arrives that her lover is missing in action, she marries her employer to allow her to indulge in her love of luxury. Her soldier lover, released from a German prisoner-of-war camp, returns and discovers that Gloria is married. He happens to be in the vicinity of her husband's house when the husband is accidentally shot by the maid. Gloria is suspected of killing her husband and arrested, but the truth is revealed by the end of the film.

Cast
 Wilfred Lucas as Horace Lennon
 Grace Darmond as Gloria Graham
 Forrest Stanley as Philip Belden
 Percy Challenger as Timothy Dunn
 Bertram Grassby as Marston Hughes
Barbara Tennant as Phyllis Miles
 Claire Du Brey as Sylvia
 William De Vaull as Norman
Mary Warren as Mamie Vezey
 Charles K. French as Attorney for the Defense (credited as Charles French)

References

External links

New York Times review

1919 films
1910s English-language films
American silent feature films
1919 drama films
Silent American drama films
American black-and-white films
Film Booking Offices of America films
1910s American films